Qanlu (also Romanized as Qānlū; also known as Qāneh) is a village in Abish Ahmad Rural District, Abish Ahmad District, Kaleybar County, East Azerbaijan Province, Iran. At the 2006 census, its population was 98, in 18 families.

References 

Populated places in Kaleybar County